Aspos (also Romanized as Asbos and Aspūs) is a village in Lahijan Rural District, Khosrowshahr District, Tabriz County, East Azerbaijan Province, Iran. At the 2006 census, its population was 552, in 142 families.

References 

Populated places in Tabriz County